Stripchat.com is an international adult website and social network featuring free live-streamed webcam performances, often including nudity and sexual activity, through traditional, virtual reality and mobile broadcasts. 

The site averages over 400 million visitors a month, according to SimilarWeb. The site first launched in 2016, and has since won numerous awards including "Cam Site of the Year" and "Cam Company of the Year" at the XBIZ Europa Awards.

The company has attracted mainstream attention with controversial campaigns and offers, such as offering $15M to rename the New Orleans Superdome and providing jobs to crew members who walked off the set of Mission: Impossible – Dead Reckoning Part One following a rant by Tom Cruise.

COVID-19 Pandemic 
Stripchat and other cam sites saw significant growth in 2020 due to the COVID-19 pandemic. During the lockdowns in March 2020, visits to the site surged 25% in countries like the United States and United Kingdom. Even after restrictions were lifted in most countries, traffic continued to rise, hitting a peak of nearly 120 million in August, up from about 60 million in January, a reverse of traditional traffic patterns. By November 2020 monthly visits to the site were more than double what they had been a year earlier. In the same period, the number of models appearing on the site increased by 300,000. In an interview with BBC News, a representative said that many traditional adult performers had moved to camming due to the lack of production on traditional porn sets, as had other types of sex workers and amateurs. Stripchat attempted to off-set increased competition from new performers coming onto the site by providing free tokens for new users.  

Many of the new users to the site are the result of changing work patterns. According to data released by the company in June 2020, 75% of visitors to the site came between the hours of 10AM and 6PM. 

In June 2020, following the extended shutdown of many businesses due to the COVID pandemic, Stripchat offered small businesses free advertising on the platform. The company asked small businesses to send in branded clothing for it to send to its most popular models. Multiple businesses applied and were accepted, including an art supply company, an erectile dysfunction device, a photography studio and a make-up artist. Models wore the clothing during their regular shows.

Sexuality Resource Center 
In addition to its adult content, Stripchat manages the Sexuality Resource Center, featuring videos of therapists answering questions about sex and relationship issues. The site began hosting live stream sessions with licensed therapists from the Sexual Health Alliance in July 2019 after a study of users showed that many felt anxiety about their cam viewing.

Sports partnerships 
Stripchat has repeatedly sought business relationships with pro-athletes and sports organizations. In 2020, Stripchat offered the New Orleans Saints $15M in hopes of gaining naming rights for the Superdome. In March 2021, the company made a £20 million bid to replace Italian tire company Pirelli as the lead sponsor of the Inter Milan football organization, after Pirelli failed to renew a nearly three-decade-old deal.

In May 2021, UFC fighter Nick Diaz announced that he had partnered with the company to conduct self-defense webinars.

See also
 Webcam model
 Internet pornography
 List of chat websites
 Porn 2.0

References

External links
 

Internet properties established in 2016
Adult camming websites
Video hosting
American erotica and pornography websites
Cypriot erotica and pornography websites